The 1922 New Hampshire football team was an American football team that represented  New Hampshire College of Agriculture and the Mechanic Arts during the 1922 college football season—the school became the University of New Hampshire in 1923. In its seventh season under head coach William "Butch" Cowell, the team compiled a 3–5–1 record, and were outscored by their opponents by a total of 180 to 105. After opening the season with three wins, the team had a five-game losing streak before ending the season with a tie. The team played its home games in Durham, New Hampshire, at Memorial Field.

Schedule

The USMC Portsmouth team was composed of Marine Corps personnel working at the Portsmouth Naval Prison in nearby Kittery, Maine. While contemporary news reports and The Granite yearbook described it as a "practice game", the result is listed by College Football Data Warehouse and the Wildcats' media guide.

The 1922 game remains the only time that the New Hampshire and Cornell football programs have met. New Hampshire and Massachusetts (commonly known as UMass since the late 1940s) next met in 1952. New Hampshire and Army next met in 2008.

Notes

References

New Hampshire
New Hampshire Wildcats football seasons
New Hampshire football